The 2006–07 CBA season is the 12th CBA season.

The season ran from October 7, 2006 to March 28, 2007. The North-South Division system was abolished. Zhejiang Lions joined the CBA in this season.

Regular Season Standings

Playoffs 
In the first round of the playoffs, top 4 teams may choose their opponents from the other 4 teams, they may also choose their place in the bracket.

In the Final series, Bayi Rockets defeated Guangdong Southern Tigers (4-1).

Teams in bold advanced to the next round. The numbers to the left of each team indicate the team's seeding in regular season, and the numbers to the right indicate the number of games the team won in that round. Home court advantage belongs to the team with the better regular season record; teams enjoying the home advantage are shown in italics.

References

See also
Chinese Basketball Association

 
Chinese Basketball Association seasons
League
CBA